Aspilapteryx tessellata is a moth of the family Gracillariidae. It is known from New South Wales, Australia. It has been recommended that this species be further studied as its placement within the genus Aspilapteryx is in need of clarification.

References

Aspilapteryx
Moths of Australia
Moths described in 1940